Stereospermum cylindricum is a tree species in the family Bignoniaceae. In Viet Nam it is called Quao vàng.

References

External links

cylindricum
Trees of Vietnam
Flora of Indo-China